Theatre or The Last Supper (German: Das letzte Souper) is a 1928 German silent film directed by Mario Bonnard and starring Marcella Albani, Heinrich George and Jean Bradin.

The film's sets were designed by the art director Julius von Borsody.

Cast
 Marcella Albani as Viola Suroff  
 Heinrich George as Stroganoff  
 Jean Bradin as Sadi  
 Evi Eva as Margot  
 Sig Arno as Gaston  
 Ita Rina as Maria  
 Wolfgang von Schwindt as Dombrowsky  
 Corry Bell as Elsa  
 Valerie Boothby as Gräfin Geschow  
 Paul Hörbiger as Balletmeister  
 Raimondo Van Riel as Zemikoff  
 Otto Kronburger as Kommissar  
 Otto Wallburg as Tenas  
 Eduardo D'Accursio as Paschkin

References

Bibliography
 Hans-Michael Bock and Tim Bergfelder. The Concise Cinegraph: An Encyclopedia of German Cinema. Berghahn Books.

External links

1928 films
Films of the Weimar Republic
Films directed by Mario Bonnard
German silent feature films
Bavaria Film films
German black-and-white films